"Diva Lady" is a song by the Divine Comedy from their 2006 album Victory for the Comic Muse. It was released on 12 June 2006 as the lead single from that album, peaking at No. 52 on the UK Singles Chart.

Track listings
7" R6698
"Diva Lady"
"Elaine"
CD single CDR6698
"Diva Lady"
"Don't Blame the Young"
Maxi-CD CDRS6698
"Diva Lady"
"Premonition of Love"
"Births, Deaths and Marriages"
"Diva Lady" (video)

External links
The Divine Comedy - official website

2006 singles
The Divine Comedy (band) songs
Songs written by Neil Hannon
2006 songs
Parlophone singles